Line voltage most commonly refers to:

 the voltage between two lines in a three-phase electrical system
 Mains electricity
 Mains electricity by country (list of countries with mains voltage and frequency)
 Line level, the specified strength of an audio signal used to transmit analog sound between audio components